Palgeo-Cheon is stream that originates in Chilgok County, North Gyeongsang Province, South Korea, and flows to Kumho rivers at PalDalDong.

The derivation of the name
The reason we call the stream Palgeo-Cheon is that old name of Chilgok-gun had been PalGeoHyeon.

The present situation
The middle highway and the fifth national highway pass along PalGeoCheon valleys.

References 
http://chilgok.grandculture.net/Contents/Index?contents_id=GC02300035 

Geography of Daegu
Rivers of South Korea
Buk District, Daegu
Chilgok County